Alcatraz: Prison Escape is an action survival video game. It was developed by Zombie Inc. and was published by Activision Value. The game was released worldwide on November 26, 2001, exclusively for the Microsoft Windows platform. Players control a falsely accused person as he attempts to escape six different types of prisons in order to prove his innocence in the outside world. Players have to sneak past guards in order to make it through every prison level. If seen, an alarm is rung that forces players to hide temporarily.

The name of the title was kept under wraps until late in the development cycle; causing the programming team to create a makeshift Alcatraz level by inserting fog horns, seagulls and a crudely drawn Golden Gate Bridge.

References

External links
Publisher's official website
Developer's website

2001 video games
Action-adventure games
Escapes and escape attempts from Alcatraz
LithTech games
Multiplayer and single-player video games
North America-exclusive video games
Survival video games
Video games developed in the United States
Video games set in prison
Video games set in San Francisco
Windows-only games
Windows games
Zombie Studios games